Lindy Wilson is a South African politician from the Democratic Alliance. She has been a member of the National Assembly of South Africa since 2014.

Political career 
Wilson is currently the Deputy Shadow Minister of Health, deputising for Siviwe Gwarube.

References 

Living people
21st-century South African politicians
21st-century South African women politicians
Democratic Alliance (South Africa) politicians
Members of the National Assembly of South Africa
Women members of the National Assembly of South Africa
White South African people
Year of birth missing (living people)